Joe Palca is an American correspondent for National Public Radio.  He specializes in science, and is the backup host for Talk of the Nation Science Friday.  Palca was also the president of the National Association of Science Writers from 1999 to 2000. He currently serves on Society for Science & the Public's board of trustees.

Education 
He attended Pomona College, graduating with an undergraduate degree in Psychology in 1974. He then received a PhD in psychology from the University of California at Santa Cruz, where he researched human sleep physiology.

Career
Palca began his career in journalism in 1982 at the CBS affiliate in Washington, DC.  He left television in 1986 to become a print journalist; he was both a Washington news editor at Nature and a senior correspondent for Science.  He went on to join NPR in 1992.

He left NPR in late 1999 for a year to study human clinical trials as a Kaiser Family Foundation Media Fellow.

Palca is now a science correspondent for NPR, mainly working on science stories and his show, Joe's Big Idea. He co-created the NPR science communication training program, formerly known as Friends of Joe's Big Idea and now called NPR Scicommers, with fellow NPR staffer Maddie Sofia.

Awards

 National Academies Communication Award
 Science-in-Society Award from the National Association of Science Writers
 James T. Grady-James H. Stack Award for Interpreting Chemistry for the Public from the American Chemical Society
 Journalism Prize from the American Association for the Advancement of Science
 Ohio State Award

References

External links
Friends of Joe's Big Idea

American male journalists
Science journalists
Living people
Year of birth missing (living people)
Pomona College alumni
Fellows of the American Academy of Arts and Sciences